Korostino is a rural locality (a selo) and the administrative center of Korostinskoye Rural Settlement, Kotovsky District, Volgograd Oblast, Russia. The population was 1,133 as of 2010. There are 19 streets.

Geography 
Korostino is located 19 km southeast of Kotovo (the district's administrative centre) by road. Plemkhoz is the nearest rural locality.

References 

Rural localities in Kotovsky District